A Shot at Dawn (German: Schuß im Morgengrauen) is a 1932 German crime film directed by Alfred Zeisler and starring Ery Bos, Genia Nikolaieva and Karl Ludwig Diehl. It was based on the play The Woman and the Emerald by Harry Jenkins and recounts a jewel theft. It was shot at the Babelsberg Studios with sets designed by the art directors Willi Herrmann and Herbert O. Phillips. A separate French-language version Coup de feu à l'aube was also produced.

Cast
 Ery Bos as Irene Taft  
 Genia Nikolajewa as Lola  
 Karl Ludwig Diehl as Petersen  
 Theodor Loos as Bachmann  
 Fritz Odemar as Dr. Sandegg  
 Peter Lorre as Klotz  
 Heinz Salfner as Joachim Taft  
 Gerhard Tandar as Müller IV  
 Kurt Vespermann as Bobby 
 Ernst Behmer as Gas Station Attendant  
 Curt Lucas as Holzknecht 
 Hermann Speelmans as Schmitter

References

Bibliography 
 Bock, Hans-Michael & Bergfelder, Tim. The Concise CineGraph. Encyclopedia of German Cinema. Berghahn Books, 2009. 
 Youngkin, Stephen.  The Lost One: A Life of Peter Lorre. University Press of Kentucky, 2005.

External links 
 

1932 films
Films of the Weimar Republic
German crime films
German black-and-white films
1932 crime films
1930s German-language films
Films directed by Alfred Zeisler
German films based on plays
German multilingual films
Films produced by Erich Pommer
UFA GmbH films
1932 multilingual films
Films shot at Babelsberg Studios
1930s German films